Callimetopus variolosus is a species of beetle in the family Cerambycidae. It was described by Schultze in 1920, originally under the genus Euclea. It is known from the Philippines.

References

Callimetopus
Beetles described in 1920